Dan Kirby may refer to:
 Dan Kirby (architect), American architect
 Dan Kirby (politician), American politician